The Gulf South Conference (GSC) is a college athletic conference affiliated with the National Collegiate Athletic Association (NCAA) at the Division II level, which operates in the Southeastern United States.

History
Originally known as the Mid-South Athletic Conference or Mid-South Conference, the Gulf South Conference was formed by six universities in the summer of 1970: Delta State, Florence State (now North Alabama), Jacksonville State, Livingston (now West Alabama), Tennessee–Martin, and Troy State (now Troy). Scheduling problems for the 1970–71 academic year limited the league to football, won by Jacksonville State.

In 1971, the league changed its name to the Gulf South Conference; added Southeastern Louisiana (SLU) and Nicholls State (increasing the membership to eight); opened an office in Hammond, Louisiana; and began championships in all men's sports. The following year, Mississippi College and Northwestern Louisiana (NWLA, now Northwestern State) were admitted. NWLA withdrew to go Division I two years later, followed by SLU and Nicholls State in 1979.

The conference continued with seven teams until 1981, when the presidents admitted Valdosta State. West Georgia joined in 1983. Eight years of stability ended in 1991 when Tennessee–Martin and Troy State went Division I, briefly dropping the GSC back to seven members, before the beginning of an expansion resulting in ten new members: Lincoln Memorial (1992–93); Alabama–Huntsville, Henderson State, Central Arkansas, and Mississippi University for Women (MUW) (1993–94); West Florida (1994–95); and Arkansas-Monticello, Arkansas Tech, Montevallo, and Southern Arkansas (1995–96). Jacksonville State went Division I at the end of 1992–93. Mississippi College dropped to Division III at the end of 1995–96 and was replaced by Christian Brothers to keep the Conference at 16 schools. In July 2000, the GSC welcomed Harding University and Ouachita Baptist University, making it the largest NCAA conference at any level with 18 schools. The Conference membership decreased to 17 when MUW dropped its athletics program at the end of the 2002–03 season.

2006–07 was another season of change for the GSC. Central Arkansas moved to Division I, leaving the West Division with eight schools while Lincoln Memorial left for the South Atlantic Conference due to travel and location issues, leaving the East Division with seven schools.

Montevallo announced on June 27, 2008 that they would be leaving for the Peach Belt Conference following the 2008–09 season due to issues between the University's President and the Commissioner.

The GSC moved away from divisional play after the 2010-11 season after its six Arkansas members broke away, dropping the membership to eight. Thanks to an aggressive expansion plan, the GSC sponsored the Division II applications of Union University (TN) and Shorter University (GA), which became official members in 2014-15. The next step in bolstering its membership came in 2012, backing the Division II application of Lee University (TN) which was on track to join the league officially in 2015-16. The league added its first-ever associate member, Florida Tech, in football only in 2013. The Conference planned to add an old friend back into the fold when Mississippi College submitted its application to rejoin Division II and was on track for 2016-17 membership.

Former Commissioner Jim McCullough brought the GSC office to Birmingham when he was hired in 1979. The conference welcomed its seventh commissioner in May 2014 when Matt Wilson was selected to follow Nate Salant who retired after a 22-year stint.

2010s realignment

Beginning with the 2011–12 academic year; Arkansas Tech University, University of Arkansas at Monticello, Harding University, Henderson State University, Ouachita Baptist University, and Southern Arkansas University left the GSC to form the Great American Conference.

The University of New Orleans, which was transitioning from Division I to Division II, was accepted into the conference in June 2011, but the school announced intentions to stay at Division I in March 2012. In July 2011, Shorter University and Union University (Jackson, Tenn.) were accepted into the NCAA and began the multi-year transition process from the NAIA to NCAA. Both universities began GSC competition in the 2012–13 academic year but will not be eligible for NCAA national tournaments until the 2014–15 academic year. In August 2011, the GSC added the Florida Institute of Technology as an associate member for football beginning in the 2013 season.

On October 11, 2012, Mississippi College announced that it would petition the NCAA to leave Division III and return to the conference. The transition was a lengthy process; Mississippi College officially became a Division II candidate starting with the 2013–14 academic year, with the school becoming a full Division II member for 2016–17.

In 2013, Lee University joined the GSC, bringing the membership to 11. Lee University moved to Division II provisional membership for the 2014-15 season. They will complete transition to Division II in the 2015-16 season. Mississippi College entered its second candidacy year with the 2014-15 season in its path to full Division II membership in 2016-17 and added Gulf South Conference teams to its schedule.

The next change to the conference's membership was officially announced on December 6, 2016 when North Alabama was accepted to the ASUN Conference and would begin a transition to Division I sports in 2018.  In May 2020, affiliate member Florida Tech announced the discontinuation of their football program due to the financial fallout of the COVID-19 pandemic.

Chronological timeline
 1970 - The Gulf South Conference (GSC) was founded as a football-only league known as the Mid-South Athletic Conference. Charter members included Delta State College (now Delta State University), Jacksonville State University, Florence State University (now the University of North Alabama), the University of Tennessee at Martin, Troy State University (now Troy University) and Livingston University (now the University of North Alabama) beginning the 1970-71 academic year.
 1971 - Nicholls State University, Northwestern State University and Southeastern Louisiana University joined the GSC in the 1971-72 academic year.
 1972 - Mississippi College joined the GSC in the 1972-73 academic year.
 1975 - Northwestern State left the GSC to become an NCAA D-II Independent (who would later join the Division I ranks of the National Collegiate Athletic Association (NCAA) and the Trans Atlantic Athletic Conference (TAAC) beginning the 1978-79 academic year) after the 1974-75 academic year.
 1979 - Nicholls State and Southeastern Louisiana left the GSC to become NCAA D-II Independents (who both would later join the NCAA Division I ranks: Nicholls State to the TAAC beginning the 1982-83 academic year as a provisional member; and Southeastern Louisiana to the Gulf Star Conference beginning the 1984-85 academic year) after the 1978-79 academic year.
 1981 - Valdosta State College (now Valdosta State University) joined the GSC in the 1981-82 academic year.
 1983 - West Georgia College (now the University of West Georgia) joined the GSC in the 1983-84 academic year.
 1991 - Tennessee–Martin (UT Martin) and Troy State left the GSC to become NCAA D-II Independents (who both would later join the NCAA Division I ranks: Tennessee–Martin (UT Martin) to the Ohio Valley Conference (OVC) beginning the 1992-93 academic year; and Troy State to the East Coast Conference (ECC) beginning the 1993-94 academic year) after the 1990-91 academic year.
 1992 - Lincoln Memorial University joined the GSC in the 1992-93 academic year.
 1993 - Jacksonville State left the GSC to become an NCAA D-II Independent (who would later join the NCAA Division I ranks and the TAAC beginning the 1995-96 academic year) after the 1992-93 academic year.
 1993 - The University of Alabama in Huntsville, the University of Central Arkansas, Henderson State University and Mississippi University for Women joined the GSC in the 1993-94 academic year.
 1994 - The University of West Florida joined the GSC in the 1994-95 academic year.
 1995 - Arkansas Tech University, the University of Arkansas at Monticello, the University of Montevallo and Southern Arkansas University joined the GSC in the 1995-96 academic year.
 1996 - Mississippi College left the GSC to join the NCAA Division III ranks and the American Southwest Conference after the 1995-96 academic year.
 1996 - Christian Brothers University joined the GSC in the 1996-97 academic year.
 2000 - Harding University and Ouachita Baptist University joined the GSC in the 2000-01 academic year.
 2003 - MUW left the GSC due to the school announcing to discontinue its athletics program after the 2002-03 academic year.
 2006 - Two institutions left the GSC to join in their respective new home primary conferences: Central Arkansas to join the NCAA Division I ranks and the Southland Conference, and Lincoln Memoria to join the South Atlantic Conference, both effective after the 2005-06 academic year.
 2009 - Montevallo left the GSC to join the Peach Belt Conference (PBC) after the 2008-09 academic year.
 2011 - Arkansas Tech, Arkansas–Monticello, Harding, Henderson State, Ouachita Baptist and Southern Arkansas left the GSC to join with a few Oklahoma schools to form the newly-created Great American Conference after the 2010-11 academic year. However, only Harding and Ouachita Baptist remained in the GSC as affiliate members for men's soccer just for the 2011 fall season (2011-12 academic year).
 2011 - University of New Orleans joined the GSC as an associate member for some sports in the 2011-12 academic year.
 2012 - New Orleans left the GSC to fully align with the NCAA Division I ranks (which would later join the Southland beginning the 2013-14 academic year) after the 2011-12 academic year.
 2012 - Shorter University and Union University joined the GSC in the 2012-13 academic year.
 2013 - Lee University joined the GSC in the 2013-14 academic year.
 2013 - Florida Institute of Technology (Florida Tech) joined the GSC as an affiliate member for football in the 2013 fall season (2013-14 academic year).
 2014 - Mississippi College rejoined the GSC in the 2014-15 academic year.
 2014 - Spring Hill College joined the GSC as an affiliate member for women's golf, and men's & women's soccer, all effective in the 2014 fall season (2014-15 academic year).
 2015 - Young Harris College joined the GSC as an affiliate member for women's lacrosse (with Montevallo re-joining for that sport) in the 2016 spring season (2015-16 academic year).
 2017 - Auburn University at Montgomery joined the GSC (with Montevallo re-joining for all sports) in the 2017-18 academic year.
 2018 - North Alabama left the GSC to join the NCAA Division I ranks and the ASUN Conference after the 2017-18 academic year.
 2018 - North Greenville University joined the GSC as an affiliate member for football in the 2018 fall season (2018-19 academic year).
 2020 - Florida Tech left the GSC as an affiliate member for football due to the school discontinuing the sport after the 2019 fall season (2019-20 academic year).
 2023 – Chowan University joins the GSC as an affiliate member for football in the 2023 and 2024 fall seasons (2023–24 and 2024–25 academic years)
 2024 – Erskine College joins the GSC from the South Atlantic Conference also as an affiliate for football in the 2024 fall season only. Shorter leaves for Conference Carolinas.

Member schools

Current members
The GSC currently has 13 full members, all but five are public schools:

Notes

Affiliate members
The GSC currently has three affiliate members; all are private schools:

 North Greenville will leave the GSC for the new Conference Carolinas football conference when it starts for the 2025 season.

Future affiliate members
The GSC will have two affiliate members, both private schools.

Former members
The GSC had 17 former full members, all but three were public schools:

Notes

Former affiliate members
The GSC had two former affiliate members, one was a public school and another was a private school:

Membership timeline

Conference venues

Sponsored sports
The GSC sponsors competition in 8 men's sports and 9 women's sports. The conference begins sponsoring women's lacrosse and men's / women's track & field in the 2015–16 school year.

Men's sponsored sports by school

Women's sponsored sports by school

Other sponsored sports by school

National championships

Valdosta State won 1979 baseball national championship prior to joining the GSC.
Mississippi College's 1989 football tournament participation and national championship were vacated by the NCAA Committee on Infractions for recruiting violations.
Ice hockey is not a conference-sanctioned sport.

References

External links

 
Sports in the Southern United States
Organizations based in Birmingham, Alabama
1970 establishments in the United States